Lawndale, Illinois may refer to:

 Lawndale, Logan County, Illinois; an unincorporated community
 Lawndale Township, McLean County, Illinois
 In Chicago
 South Lawndale, Chicago, a neighborhood
 North Lawndale, Chicago, a neighborhood

See also
 Lawndale (disambiguation)